Gentex or Gentex Corporation may refer to:
 Gentex (standard), a protocol for telegraphs;
 Gentex (automotive manufacturer);
 Gentex (military contractor)